Marie-Évelyne Lessard is a Canadian film and television actress. She is most noted for her performance in the 2012 film Fair Sex (Les Manèges humains), for which she received a Jutra Award nomination for Best Actress at the 16th Jutra Awards in 2014.

She has also appeared in the films Ville-Marie, The Decline (Jusqu'au déclin) and Fanmi, the television series Unité 9, Les Argonautes, Trauma and 19-2, and the web series Féminin/Féminin.

References

External links
 

Canadian film actresses
Canadian television actresses
Black Canadian actresses
Actresses from Quebec
Living people
21st-century Canadian actresses
Year of birth missing (living people)